Ghosta may refer to:

 Ghosta, Bihar, India
 Ghosta, Lebanon, Lebanon
 Ghosta, Afghanistan, a small village on the Kabul River